Interleukin-1 receptor (IL-1R) is a cytokine receptor which binds interleukin 1.  Two forms of the receptor exist.  The type I receptor is primarily responsible for transmitting the inflammatory effects of interleukin-1 (IL-1) while type II receptors may act as a suppressor of IL-1 activity by competing for IL-1 binding.  Also opposing the effects of IL-1 is the IL-1 receptor antagonist (IL-1RA).

The IL-1 receptor accessory protein (IL1RAP) is a transmembrane protein that interacts with IL-1R and is required for IL-1 signal transduction.

References

External links
 

Immunoglobulin superfamily cytokine receptors